Torghatten is a granite dome on the island of Torget in Brønnøy Municipality in Nordland county, Norway. It is known for its characteristic hole, or natural tunnel, through its center.  It is possible to walk up to the tunnel on a well-prepared path, and through it on a natural path.

On 6 May 1988, Widerøe Flight 710 from Namsos to Brønnøysund crashed into the side of the mountain, and all 36 passengers and crew died.

Tunnel

According to legend, the hole was made by the troll Hestmannen while he was chasing the beautiful girl Lekamøya. As the troll realized he would not get the girl, he released an arrow to kill her, but the troll-king of Sømna threw his hat into the arrow's path to save her. The hat turned into the mountain with a hole in the middle.

It was formed during the Scandinavian ice age. Ice and water eroded the looser rocks, while the harder ones in the mountain top have resisted erosion.

See also

Monte Forato, in the Alpi Apuane
Moon Hill, in Yangshuo County
Elephant Trunk Hill, in Guilin

Media gallery

References

External links
Brønnøy municipality website about Torghatten 

Brønnøy
Mountains of Nordland
Tourist attractions in Nordland